Vineland Avenue is a major north-south thoroughfare in the San Fernando Valley.

Geography
Vineland Avenue begins as a very small residential street north of the railroad tracks at San Fernando Road. It cuts at the tracks, but then turns into a major street as a continuation of Sunland Boulevard south of San Fernando Road in Sun Valley.  It runs through the San Fernando Valley through many districts and communities such as Sun Valley, North Hollywood (passing the nearby B/G line station of the same name), and Studio City before ending south of Ventura Boulevard near Universal City.

Transportation
Vineland Avenue carries Metro Local lines 90 and 222; the former runs north of Magnolia Boulevard and the latter near Universal City.

External links

Streets in the San Fernando Valley
Streets in Los Angeles
North Hollywood, Los Angeles
Studio City, Los Angeles
Sun Valley, Los Angeles 
Universal City, California